Howard Estabrook (born Howard Bolles, July 11, 1884 – July 16, 1978) was an American actor, film director and producer, and screenwriter.

Biography
Born Howard Bolles in Detroit, Michigan, Howard Estabrook began his career in 1904 as a stage actor in New York.  He made his film debut in 1914 during the silent era, and would go on to appear in several features including Four Feathers. Estabrook left films in 1916 for a try at the business world, but returned in 1921.

Estabrook took on executive positions with various studios, and eventually began producing films in 1924. He soon found his calling in screenwriting.  He was responsible for several of what have come to be regarded as classics of Hollywood including Hell's Angels (1930) and Street of Chance (1930), for which he was nominated for an Academy Award. The following year, he won an Academy Award for Best Adapted Screenplay for Cimarron, starring Richard Dix and Irene Dunne. In 1935, he (along with Hugh Walpole and Lenore J. Coffee) adapted the Charles Dickens novel David Copperfield for the 1935 film version starring W. C. Fields and Lionel Barrymore.

Estabrook continued in his screenwriting career for three decades, as well as directing and producing films before his death on July 16, 1978, in Woodland Hills, Los Angeles, California.

Selected filmography

Awards and nominations

References

External links

Howard Estabrook papers, Margaret Herrick Library, Academy of Motion Picture Arts and Sciences

1884 births
1978 deaths
Film producers from Michigan
American male screenwriters
American male silent film actors
American male stage actors
Best Adapted Screenplay Academy Award winners
Male actors from Detroit
Silent film directors
Film directors from Michigan
20th-century American male actors
Screenwriters from Michigan
20th-century American male writers
20th-century American screenwriters